Taylor Arthur Gray (born September 7, 1993) is an American actor, best known for playing Ezra Bridger on the animated television series Star Wars Rebels, and Bucket in the Nickelodeon series Bucket & Skinner's Epic Adventures.

He also played animator Friz Freleng in the 2015 film Walt Before Mickey, and the lead role of Brian in the 2012 film Thunderstruck with professional basketball player Kevin Durant.

Filmography

Film

Television

Video games

References

External links 

1993 births
Living people
American male voice actors
Male models from California
American male television actors
Actors from Whittier, California